Joe Daly may refer to:

 Joe Daly (comics) (born 1979), South African comics artist
 Joe Daly (baseball) (1868–1943), American baseball player
 Joe Daly (footballer) (1897–1941), English footballer

See also
 Joe Daley (disambiguation)